Histoire naturelle des poissons is a 22-volume treatment of ichthyology published  in  1828–1849 by the French savant  Georges Cuvier (1769–1832) and his student and successor Achille Valenciennes (1794–1865). It was a systematic compendium of the fishes of the world known at that time, and treated altogether 4 514 species of fishes, of which 2 311 were new to science. It is still one of the most ambitious undertakings in ichthyology ever. Most of the work appeared after the death of Cuvier. Later, Auguste Duméril still supplemented the work by two volumes in 1865 and 1870, which dealt mostly with groups that Cuvier had omitted, such as sharks.

Cuvier's treatment was not only based on the resources and samples of the Muséum national d'histoire naturelle, where he was a director, but also on an extensive network of correspondents and explorers that were travelling around the world and collecting and sending samples and observations.

The species descriptions are often accurate and well prepared, as are the illustrations, but there are exceptions for instance when based on poorly preserved material or on just one sex. At all events, the work remained as a basic reference for several generations of ichthyologists.

External links
Histoire naturelle des poissons t.1 - t.22   online version at Biodiversity Heritage Library
 Histoire naturelle des poissons. Vol. 6 in Google Books
A. Dumeril (1865)  Histoire naturelle des poissons, ou, Ichthyologie générale, vol. 2 supplementary volume online at  Biodiversity Heritage Library

Ichthyological literature
1828 non-fiction books